Xinshi is a town under the administration of Zaoyang City in the western slopes of the Dabie Mountains of Hubei, People's Republic of China, located  south of the border with Henan and  northeast of downtown Zaoyang City. , it has two residential communities and 39 villages under its administration.

Administrative divisions
Communities:
Xinshi, Qiangang

Villages:
Xinyi, Qianjing, Lilou, Hongyanhe, Dayan, Luolou, Dongliwan, Xiepeng, Zhaozhuang, Zhangxiang, Xiaozhuang, Luohebei, Huangwan, Pengzhuang, Huoqing, Xingchuan, Zhoulou, Qianwan, Zhengjiawan, Fujiawan, Mengziping, Tanghe, Xinji, Luozhuang, Qiangangyi, Qiangang'er, Wanglaozhuang, Qiandang, Xionggang, Wangdaqiao, Xiliwang, Gaoya, Shantouli, Dengpeng, Yaopeng, Bailu, Yangzhuang, Rengang, Quangou

See also
List of township-level divisions of Hubei

References

Township-level divisions of Hubei